Felaniella rakiura is a species of small marine bivalve mollusc in the family Ungulinidae.

References
 Powell A. W. B., William Collins Publishers Ltd, Auckland 1979 

Ungulinidae
Bivalves of New Zealand
Molluscs described in 1939